Blower may refer to:

People 
 Blower (surname)
 Henry Blofeld (born 1939), British sports journalist

Other uses 
 Blower, a fish of the family Tetraodontidae 
 Blower (snake) (Heterodon platirhinos)
 Blower fan, a type of mechanical fan
 Leaf blower, a gardening tool
 Party blower, a device for making noises at a party.
 Supercharger on an internal-combustion engine
 Telephone
 , a submarine of the United States Navy
 A device to increase the draught of a locomotive, see blastpipe

See also 
 Blowers, a surname